Cockcroft is a lunar impact crater that is situated on the far side of the Moon from the Earth, so that it has only been observed and photographed from orbit. It lies to the northeast of the larger crater Fitzgerald, and southeast of Evershed.

The rim of this crater is worn and eroded from subsequent impacts. The satellite crater Cockcroft N is intruding into the south-southwestern rim. There are small craters along the rim to the southeast, east, and north-northwest, and a small crater lies along the eastern inner wall. The interior floor is uneven in places, particularly in the southern half, and contains multiple small and tiny craterlets.

Satellite craters
By convention these features are identified on lunar maps by placing the letter on the side of the crater midpoint that is closest to Cockcroft.

References

 
 
 
 
 
 
 
 
 
 
 
 

Impact craters on the Moon